Cigaritis buchanani is a butterfly in the family Lycaenidae. It is found in the Gambia, northern Nigeria, Mali and Chad.

References

Butterflies described in 1966
Cigaritis